Novoselytsia Raion was a raion (administrative district) in Chernivtsi Oblast, (province) in the west of Ukraine. The western part of its territory lied in the historical region of Bukovina, the eastern part in Bessarabia, while one village (Boianivka) was part of the Hertsa region. The center of the raion was the city of Novoselytsia. The raion was abolished on 18 July 2020 as part of the administrative reform of Ukraine, which reduced the number of raions of Chernivtsi Oblast to three. The area of Novoselytsia Raion was split between Chernivtsi and Dnistrovskyi Raions. The last estimate of the raion population was

History and population
According to the 2001 Ukrainian Census, the raion's population was 87,241. The ethnical composition was as follows:

Among the 50,329 self-identified Moldovans, 47,585 self-identified their language as Moldovan and 2,264 as Romanian according to the Ukrainian census of 2001.

The singer Sofia Rotaru was born in Marshyntsi, one of the Romanian speaking villages of the Raion.

The village of Tarasivtsi, located in the raion, is notable as the only place in Ukraine where the Moldovan (Romanian) language has been designated as a regional language. This occurred after Ukraine permitted regional languages to be designated in August 2012 .

Administrative divisions

Novoselytsia Raion had 1 city and 30 communes:

Novoselytsia - administrative seat

Communes
Balkivtsi
Berestia
Boiany
Cherlenivka
Chornivka
Dovzhok
Dranytsia
Dynivtsi
Forosna
Kostychany
Koteleve
Mahala
Malynivka
Mamalyha
Marshyntsi
Nesvoia
Podvirne
Prypruttia
Ridkivtsi
Rokytne
Rynhach
Shcherbyntsi
Sloboda
Stalnivtsi
Strointsi
Tarasivtsi
Toporivtsi
Vanchykivtsi
Zelenyi Hai
Zhylivka

Of these, Boiany, Chornivka, Mahala, Sloboda, Pripruttia, Toporivtsi and Zelenyi Hai are in the historical region of Bukovina, while the remainder are in Bessarabia.

At the time of disestablishment, the raion consisted of six hromadas:
 Boiany rural hromada with the administration in the selo of Boiany, transferred to Chernivtsi Raion;
 Mahala rural hromada with the administration in the selo of Mahala, transferred to Chernivtsi Raion;
 Mamalyha rural hromada with the administration in the selo of Mamalyha, transferred to Dnistrovskyi Raion;
 Novoselytsia urban hromada with the administration in Novoselytsia, transferred to Chernivtsi Raion;
 Toporivtsi rural hromada with the administration in the selo of Toporivtsi, transferred to Chernivtsi Raion;
 Vanchykivtsi rural hromada with the administration in the selo of Vanchykivtsi, transferred to Chernivtsi Raion.

Toporyvtsi rural hromada also contained three villages, Kolinkivtsi, Hrozyntsi, and Bochkivtsi, which belonged to Khotyn Raion.

References

External links
Novoselytskyi Raion -  official website 
 Verkhovna Rada website - Administrative divisions of Novoselytskyi Raion 

Former raions of Chernivtsi Oblast
Romanian communities in Ukraine
1940 establishments in Ukraine
Ukrainian raions abolished during the 2020 administrative reform